West Adams is a historic neighborhood in the South Los Angeles region of Los Angeles, California. The area is known for its large number of historic buildings, structures and notable houses and mansions.

History

West Adams is one of the oldest neighborhoods in the city of Los Angeles, with most of its buildings erected between 1880 and 1925, including the William Andrews Clark Memorial Library. West Adams was developed by railroad magnate Henry E. Huntington and wealthy industrialist Hulett C. Merritt of Pasadena. It was once the wealthiest district in the city, with its Victorian mansions and sturdy Craftsman bungalows, and a home to Downtown businessmen and professors and academicians at The University of Southern California. Several historic areas of West Adams, namely, Harvard Heights, Lafayette Square, Pico-Union, and West Adams Terrace, were designated as Historic Preservation Overlay Zones by the city of Los Angeles, in recognition of their outstanding architectural heritage. Menlo Avenue-West Twenty-ninth Street Historic District, North University Park Historic District, Twentieth Street Historic District, Van Buren Place Historic District and St. James Park Historic District, all with houses of architectural significance, are located in West Adams.

The development of the West Side, Beverly Hills and Hollywood, beginning in the 1910s, siphoned away much of West Adams' upper-class white population; upper-class blacks began to move in around this time, although the district was off limits to all but the very wealthiest African-Americans. One symbol of the area's emergence as a center of black wealth at this time is the landmark 1949 headquarters building of the Golden State Mutual Life Insurance Company, a late-period Moderne structure at Adams and Western designed by renowned black architect Paul Williams. It housed what was once one of the nation's largest black-owned insurers (currently, along with an adjacent new building, it is now a campus for a large non-profit). West Adams' transformation into an affluent black area was sped by the Supreme Court's 1948 invalidation of segregationist covenants on property ownership. The area was a favorite among black celebrities in the 1940s and 1950s; notable residents included Hattie McDaniel, Tim Moore, Eddie Anderson, Joe Louis, Sweet Daddy Grace, Little Richard, Lionel Hampton and Ray Charles.

Singer Ray Charles's business headquarters, including his RPM studio, is located at 2107 Washington Boulevard. The intersection of Washington Boulevard and Westmoreland Boulevard, at the studio, is named "Ray Charles Square" in his honor.

Starting in 1961, construction of the ten-lane Santa Monica Freeway (Interstate 10) tore through West Adams' core, with the freeway routed east to west just north of Adams Boulevard. Its construction resulted in the taking by eminent domain, and demolition, of numerous West Adams homes, including a number of mansions owned by African Americans. The construction resulted in substantial displacement of West Adams residents, including the relocation of much of the area's affluent Black families. As the Los Angeles Sentinel reported:The road could have been built without cutting through the so-called Sugar Hill section. However, in order to miss Sugar Hill, it was "said" that the route would have to cut through fraternity and sorority row area around USC. Sorority and fraternity row still stands and Sugar Hill doesn't, so you know who won out!As in many other American cities during the heyday of Interstate Highway Act construction, interstate highway rights of way were disproportionately routed through predominantly African American communities, causing substantial displacement of residents and steep declines in neighborhood viability.

In the past, many African-American gays had moved into the neighborhood, and it became the center of black gay life in Los Angeles, even earning the nickname of "the black West Hollywood" or "the black Silver Lake"

Many of the neighborhoods, including West Adams, are experiencing a renaissance of sorts with their historic houses being restored to their previous elegance.

The area is undergoing gentrification, with young professionals, restaurants, new businesses moving into the area. Many professionals are being attracted to the area, due to the proximity of job hubs in Silicon Beach, Culver City, and El Segundo.

In 2007, the city approved the "West Adams Streetscape Enhancement Program" proposed by LANI (Los Angeles Neighborhood Initiative). Improvements included the installation of four "gateway markers" at the corners of Adams Boulevard and Western Avenue and Adams Boulevard and Vermont Avenue.  Additionally, 58 magnolia trees were planted along Adams Boulevard between Western and Vermont Avenues, along with additional trees clustered near the gateway markers.

Geography

The City of Los Angeles

Beginning in 2000, the Eighth District Empowerment Congress began working on the "Naming Neighborhoods Project" to identify and name the communities with the neighborhood council area.  Through research, a meeting with an urban historian, and numerous community meetings, sixteen neighborhoods, including the neighborhood of West Adams, were submitted to City Council in October 2001 and approved in February 2002. 

West Adams is bounded by Western Avenue on the west, Vermont Avenue on the east, Jefferson Boulevard on the south and the Santa Monica Freeway on the north. 

At that time, the city was directed to install "West Adams"  neighborhood signs on Vermont, Western and Adams Boulevards 

Additionally, the area is marked with large concrete "gateway markers" at Western and Adams and Vermont and Adams.

Mapping L.A.
According to the "Mapping L.A." project of the Los Angeles Times, West Adams' street boundaries are the Santa Monica Freeway on the north, Crenshaw Boulevard on the east, Exposition and Jefferson Boulevards on the south and the Culver City line on the west (Ballona Creek and Fairfax Avenue).
 

Project leader Doug Smith reported that, in response by the public to advance posting of the proposed maps, "Among the bitter rifts we encountered were the competing claims to the name West Adams."

West Adams Neighborhood Council
The West Adams Neighborhood Council covers the area south of the US-10 freeway, north of Obama Boulevard between Chesapeake Avenue and W. Jefferson Boulevard, north of Coliseum Street between Chesapeake Avenue and Crenshaw Boulevard, west of Crenshaw Boulevard, and east of La Cienega Boulevard and Ballona Creek (abutting the city limits of Culver City). It includes the neighborhood of Crenshaw Manor.

West Adams Heritage Association

The West Adams Heritage Association states that West Adams stretches "roughly from Figueroa Street on the east to West Boulevard on the west, and from Pico Boulevard on the north to Jefferson Boulevard on the south."

Tracts and districts

West Adams is home to one of the largest collections of historic houses and small mansions west of the Mississippi River. The West Adams neighborhood was developed between 1880 and 1925 and contains many diverse architectural styles of the era, including the Queen Anne, Shingle, Gothic Revival, Transitional Arts and Crafts, American Craftsman/Ultimate Bungalow, Craftsman Bungalow, Colonial Revival, Renaissance Revival, Mediterranean Revival, Spanish Colonial Revival, Mission Revival, Egyptian Revival, Beaux-Arts and Neoclassical styles. West Adams boasts the only existing Greene and Greene house left in the entire city of Los Angeles.

More than 70 sites in West Adams have received recognition as a Los Angeles Historic-Cultural Monument, a California Historical Landmark, or listing on the National Register of Historic Places.

Kinney Heights

Kinney Heights was developed around 1900 by developer Abbot Kinney, for whom it is named. It was a suburban tract of large wealthy Craftsman style houses at what was then the western edge of Los Angeles. The houses featured amenities like "beveled-glass china cabinets, marble fireplaces and mahogany floors". It was accessible to downtown via streetcar and attracted upper-class families.

Many of the hundred-year-old structures are still standing and have been renovated and upgraded. The neighborhood is part of the West Adams Terrace Historic Preservation Overlay Zone (HPOZ).

Twentieth Street Historic District

The Twentieth Street Historic District consists of a row of bungalows and Craftsman-style houses in the 900 block on the south side of 20th Street.

Demographics
According to the Mapping L.A. project of the Los Angeles Times, a total of 21,764 people lived in West Adams's 1.48 square miles, according to the 2000 U.S. census—averaging 14,686 people per square mile, among the highest population densities in the city as a whole. Population was estimated at 22,857 in 2008. The median age was 28, considered young when compared to the city as a whole. The percentages of residents aged birth to 18 were among the county's highest.

Latinos made up 56.2% of the population, with black people at 37.6%, white people 2.4%, Asian 1.7%, and other 2%.  Mexico and El Salvador were the most common places of birth for the 36.9% of the residents who were born abroad, an average percentage of foreign-born when compared with the city or county as a whole.

The $38,209 median household income in 2008 dollars was considered low for the city and county. The percentage of households earning $20,000 or less was high, compared to the county at large. The average household size of 3.1 people was about average for the city. Renters occupied 62.8% of the housing units, and homeowners occupied the rest.

In 2000, there were 1,078 families headed by single parents, or 21.8%, a rate that was high for the county and the city. The percentages of never-married women (39.5) and divorced women (5.7) were among the county's highest.
Just 7.8% of residents aged 25 and older had a four-year degree, a percentage considered low for the city and the county; the percentage with less than a high school diploma (not stated) was considered high.

Education
The schools within the West Adams neighborhood are as follows:

 Stella Middle Charter Academy, LAUSD, 2636 Mansfield Avenue
 Cienega Elementary School, LAUSD, 2611 South Orange Drive
 Cleophas Oliver Learning Academy, private elementary, 4449 West Adams Boulevard
 Virginia Road Elementary School, LAUSD, public, 2925 Virginia Road
 Full Circle Learning Academy, LAUSD charter, 1850 West 96th Street
 Crown Preparatory Academy, 2055 W. 24th St.

Recreation and parks
Loren Miller Recreation Center , 2717 Halldale Avenue
 Richardson Family Park, 2700 S. Budlong Avenue

Transportation
The Metro E Line from Downtown Los Angeles to Santa Monica includes three stations in West Adams: La Cienega/Jefferson, Expo/La Brea and Farmdale.

Government
West Adams has one Fire station in the neighborhood. The Los Angeles Fire Department operates Station 26, located at 2009 S. Western Avenue.

Police services in West Adams are provided by the Los Angeles Police Department’s Southwest Division.

Notable places
Olympic Village 1932 Summer Olympics (near intersection of Adams and Hoover)
Forthmann House – At 1102 W. 28th Street, a Victorian home built in 1880.  This home is known as the Forthmann House and was built for the founders of the Los Angeles Soap Co.  It is characterized by its mansard-roofed tower.
John B. Kane Residence (Bonsallo Avenue, located near 23rd St)

Notable people

Hattie McDaniel, actress, the first African-American to win an Academy Award.
Tim Moore, vaudeville comedian; star of CBS-TV's situation comedy, Amos 'n' Andy.
Joe Louis, pugilist
Sweet Daddy Grace
Clementina D. Griffin, school principal, aviator
Little Richard, singer
Lionel Hampton, musician
Ray Charles, singer
Leila Holterhoff, singer, linguist, psychoanalyst
Conejo rapper

In popular culture
Its historic homes are frequently used as locations for movie films and TV shows including CBS's CSI, Six Feet Under, The Shield, Monk, Confessions of a Dangerous Mind, and Of Mice and Men.

The neighborhood is featured in Visiting... with Huell Howser Episode 110.

See also

 List of Registered Historic Places in Los Angeles
 List of Los Angeles Historic-Cultural Monuments in South Los Angeles
 South Los Angeles

References

External links

WAHA—West Adams Heritage Association
Los Angeles Times: Saving Harvard Heights
Van Buren Place Community Restoration Association
West Adams Heights/Sugar Hill Neighborhood Association 
United Neighborhoods Council

 
Neighborhoods in Los Angeles
Los Angeles Historic Preservation Overlay Zones
South Los Angeles